Chemistry of Natural Compounds is a bimonthly peer-reviewed scientific journal covering research on the chemistry of natural compounds. It was established in 1965 and is published by  Springer Science+Business Media. The editor-in-chief is Sh. Sh. Sagdullaev.

According to the Journal Citation Reports, the journal had a 2020 impact factor of 0.809.

References

External links 
 

English-language journals
Springer Science+Business Media academic journals
Chemistry journals
Bimonthly journals
Publications established in 1965